Giuseppe Franchi (1731 – 1806) was an Italian Neoclassical sculptor.

After studying Neoclassical art in Rome under Johann Joachim Winckelmann, he taught at the Brera Academy in Milan from its beginning in 1776 where he worked with the architect Giuseppe Piermarini.

Among his Milan works are decorations for the Royal Palace, for the facade of the Teatro alla Scala and for Karl Joseph von Firmian's monument in the Church of San Bartolomeo. In 1782, he sculpted the mermaids and dolphins for Piermarini's fountain at Piazza Fontana. Among his pupils were Angelo Pizzi.<ref>*</</ref>

See also
Neoclassical architecture in Milan

References

18th-century Italian sculptors
Italian male sculptors
19th-century Italian sculptors
1731 births
1806 deaths
People from Carrara
19th-century Italian male artists
18th-century Italian male artists